Rowing Across the Atlantic is a 1978 French animated short film directed by Jean-François Laguionie. The film was scripted by Laguionie and Jean-Paul Gaspari and features the voices of Charlotte Maury and Jean-Pierre Sentier. It premiered at the 1978 Cannes Film Festival and was released in French cinemas on 25 October 1978.

Summary
It tells the story of a couple who leave turn-of-the-century New York City in a rowing boat and spend their lives together forever in the Atlantic Ocean.

Accolades
The film won the Short Film Palme d'Or at the 1978 Cannes Film Festival, the Grand Prize at the 1978 Ottawa International Animation Festival and the César Award for Best Animated Short Film at the 4th César Awards.

See also
French animation
Titanic-seen in the film

References

External links
Commentary from the filmmaker on YouTube

1978 animated films
1970s French animated films
1970s animated short films
Films directed by Jean-François Laguionie
Films set in the Atlantic Ocean
French animated short films
French drama films
1970s French-language films
Short Film Palme d'Or winners
1978 films
1978 short films